Edward Stanley Dixon (26 May 1894 – 13 August 1979) was an English professional footballer who played in the Football League for Hull City, Newcastle United and Blackburn Rovers as a wing half or inside right.

Personal life 
In April 1915, with the First World War underway, Dixon enlisted in the Tyne Electrical Engineers. He had risen to the rank of acting corporal by July 1917 and spent the war on anti-aircraft duty in Britain. He finished the war with the rank of sergeant. After his retirement from football, Dixon managed a cinema in Hull.

Career statistics

References 

1894 births
Sportspeople from Easington, County Durham
Footballers from County Durham
English footballers
1979 deaths
Newcastle United F.C. players
Blackburn Rovers F.C. players
British Army personnel of World War I
Tyne Electrical Engineers soldiers
Association football wing halves
Association football inside forwards
Hull City A.F.C. players
English Football League players
Film exhibitors